Bulimulus hoodensis is a species of land snail in the family Bulimulidae. It is endemic to Española Island, one of the Galápagos Islands. The species reproduces sexually.

References

Bulimulus
Endemic gastropods of the Galápagos Islands
Gastropods described in 1893
Taxonomy articles created by Polbot